The Horsley Drive is a  urban sealed road located in the City of Fairfield in greater western Sydney, New South Wales, Australia.

History
Horsley Park, Sydney was originally part of Colonel George Johnston's  property "Kings Gift". After his death it passed to his daughter Blanche who in 1829 married Major George Nicholas Weston. He built an Indian colonial style homestead on the property and named it "Horsley" after his birthplace in Surrey, England. In 1959, The Horsley Drive (so named because it leads to Horsley Park, Sydney) opened up as a continuous route from Lansvale. Fairfield Hospital was constructed on The Horsley Drive in Fairfield on September 1956, but was then relocated in 1988.

Background
The Horsley Drive between the M7 Motorway and Cowpasture Road in Horsley Park, Sydney is an arterial road connection into the Smithfield and Wetherill Park industrial area supplying an crucial motor link to and from the M7 Motorway. The road provides a prominent vehicular path between urban, commercial and industrial areas, the M7, Sydney Orbital Network and farther. Clustered tree planting near Cowpasture Road (South side of The Horsley Drive only), as well near the M7 Motorway indicates the natural aesthetic of the topical landscape to underline The Horsley Drive’s entry into the Western Sydney Parklands scenery.

Access

There are three main pedestrian and cycle access points to The Horsley Drive at the M7 Motorway, Ferrers Road and the Upper Canal System. At this point, Ferrers Road forms the gateway to the Horsley Park Urban Farming Precinct. Several private driveways also have access to The Horsley Drive. Access to the Sydney International Equestrian Centre is from Saxony Road, while emergency access to the site is also provided from The Horsley Drive.

Commercial areas
Besides industry, The Horsley Drive also has several commercial and cultural establishments on its strip. Fairfield City Museum & Gallery in Smithfield lie on the road, as does the suburb's main commercial area which features a tavern, a TAB and a number of multicultural restaurants. Wetherill Park Market Town and Greenway Plaza are also located on this road, with the latter containing prominent retail stores (such as The Good Guys, Officeworks and Supercheap Auto), various ethnic restaurants, grocery stores Sydney's first Carls jr and a Service NSW office.

Facilities
Minh Giac Vietnamese Buddhist Temple in Smithfield is located on The Horsley Drive. Educational facilities on the road include a Tafe and Fairfield High School.

Recreational areas situated on the road include Wetherill Park Nature Reserve and several picnic spots in Western Sydney Parklands such as Lizard Log. The attribute of the Parklands is brought as close as possible to the road's bound, conceptualising the driver experience as The Horsley Drive crossbeams the Parklands.

See also

References

Streets in Sydney
1959 establishments in Australia
Roads in New South Wales